Aqib and Aaqib are male given names. Notable people with these names include:

 Aqib Ilyas (born 1992), Omani cricketer
 Aqib Javed (born 1997), Pakistani cricketer
 Aaqib Javed (born 1972), Pakistani cricketer and coach
 Aqib Khan (born 1994), Pakistani actor
 Aaqib Khan (born 2003), Indian cricketer
 Aqib Shah (born 1995), Pakistani cricketer
 Aqib Talib (born 1986), American American football player

See also
 Aquib

Masculine given names